Cairo International Model United Nations (CIMUN) is a collegiate level model United Nations organisation that is based in Cairo, Egypt. The CIMUN program is the oldest student activity on the American University in Cairo (AUC) campus and is currently recognised as one of the largest inter-collegiate model United Nations programs outside of North America. It is well known for its annual conference in March.

History
It was founded in 1989 by a group of AUC students under the guidance of the Provost of AUC, Professor Earl Tim Sullivan, during his time as a professor in the department of political science.

A fund was made in 2005 in honour of Nadia Younes, under which a conference and meeting room for the support of the model United Nations was created.

Since 2007, several elite high school students have been chosen by merit to join the conference. This has led to the expansion of the model from modelling only one UN council to seven: the Security Council, HRC, ICJ, ECOSOC, International Criminal Court, CTC, and UN Women.

In 2010, CIMUN won the Outstanding Delegation Award while at the National Model United Nations Conference in New York. While this is the second time the group has won the award, this time is considered more important because the group was representing their own country, Egypt. CIMUN won the outstanding delegation award in all the following years. That means they won the award for twelve consecutive years along with multiple honorable mentions.

High Board members
Each year a different High Board is chosen to lead the organization's team. Every High Board consists of three positions: Secretary General, Graduate Advisor and Organizing Committee Head. The following is a list of the High Boards since 2002:

2002-2003: Mohamed Gabr, Mohamed Hilal, Dina Harb/Mohamed El Zanaty

2003-2004: Mohamed Menza, Mohamed Gabr, Mohamed El Zanaty

2004-2005: Hedayat Heikal, Sara Rizk, Moataz Samir

2005-2006: Mena Rizk, Tarek Mahfouz, Nora Badra

2006-2007: Nouran Kashef, Yasmine El Rifaie, Noha Khalid

2007-2008: Omar El Orabi, Dalia Ashour, Nadia Mohasseb

2008-2009: Kismet El Husseiny, Pensee Afifi, Sara Negm

2009-2010: Hussein Salama, Omar El Nayal, Amin Badra

2012-2013: Mokhtar Ibrahim, Shatha El Nakib, Hussien Heiba

2013-2014: Yara Sakr, Munir Beletemal, Ali Hossam

2014-2015: Radwa Hamed, Rana Shafik, Hesham Sadek

2015-2016: Mohamed El-Serkeek, Mariam Mohsen, Ramy Mubasher 

2016-2017: Omar Zaky, Nour Shafik, Omar Rezk

2017-2018: Mohamed ElShalakany, Omar Zaky, Mazhar Ibrahim

2018-2019: Marwan ElSayed, Ziyad Rushdy, Mariam Hatem

2019-2020: Farh Elwishi, Youssef Sabek, Lamis Sallam

2020-2021: Abdullah Bakr, Nour Abdeldayem, Nada Khaled

2021-2022: Youssef Ragai, Fayrouz Ibrahim, Nada Selim

2022-2023: Lara Radwan, Farid H. Moursi, Ali Hussein Ali

March conference
CIMUN holds an annual conference in March. Its primary goal is to increase student interest in and awareness of the United Nations and international affairs. The conference events are wholly organised by students. Participants from international universities—including Yale, Stanford, Columbia, Concordia, and Riverside City College—have attended the conference.

Keynote speakers
The following is a list of some notable keynote speakers for past March conferences, along with the year of the speech:

Boutros Ghali
Ali El Din Helal
Ahmed Maher
Suzanne Mubarak (1998)
Kofi Annan (2002)
Youssef Boutros Ghali, El-Sayed Yassin, and Ibrahim Kamel (2000)
Nabil Elaraby (2006)
Mohammed El Farnawany (2007)
Amr Moussa (2008)

See also
AUC Press
American University in Cairo
American University in Dubai (AUD)
American University of Beirut (AUB)
American University of Iraq - Sulaimani (AUI)
American University of Sharjah (AUS)
List of model United Nations conferences
Model United Nations
United Nations

References

External links
Official Website
 
 "Celebrating International Women’s Day in the American University in Cairo" - The Suzanne Mubarak Women’s International Peace Movement
 "Cairo Model UN inaugurates its 19th session" - Daily News Egypt

Model United Nations
The American University in Cairo
Conventions (meetings)